Frank Smith (22 November 1889 – 1982) was an English professional footballer who played as a wing half.

References

1889 births
1982 deaths
Footballers from Sheffield
English footballers
Association football wing halves
Sheffield F.C. players
Barnsley F.C. players
Swansea City A.F.C. players
Grimsby Town F.C. players
Charlton's F.C. players
Haycroft Rovers F.C. players
Louth Town F.C. players
English Football League players
People from Darnall